Leiden University College The Hague (LUC) is a small interdisciplinary Liberal Arts and Sciences honours college part of the Faculty of Governance and Global Affairs of Leiden University. The institution's curriculums focus on tackling global challenges, such as peace and justice, sustainability, prosperity and diversity.

The college is located in a single building besides the Den Haag Centraal Railway Station in The Hague, Netherlands. The college has a residential concept in which students typically live on campus for the first two years of the programme.

Programme 
The first year of the study programme consists of foundational classes in global challenges and skills such as academic writing and statistics. After the first year, students specialise in one of six majors which will determine their degree:

 Culture, History, Society (BA)
 International Justice (BA)
 World Politics (BA)
 Earth, Energy and Sustainability (BSc)
 Global Public Health (BSc)
 Governance, Economics and Development (BSc)

Accreditation and rankings 
The programme is accredited by the Accreditation Organisation of the Netherlands and Flanders (NVAO).

As Leiden University College The Hague is part of Leiden University, it does not participate in international rankings on its own. The study programme has been awarded a "top rated programme" seal by Dutch education evaluator Keuzegids. In 2021, Keuzegids ranked LUC The Hague as the highest rated university college and the third highest rated bachelor's programme in the Netherlands.

Notable staff 
Some faculty of LUC The Hague are notable for their achievements in academia, journalism, law or politics.
 Giles Scott-Smith, Dean and Professor Transnational Relations and New Diplomatic History
 Aernout van Lynden, former war correspondent
 Jet Bussemaker, former Dutch Minister of Education, Culture and Science and Professor Science, Policy and Societal Impact in Healthcare
The college also has several Distinguished Fellows, who are not employed full-time at the institution but contribute to the programme via guest lectures, thesis supervision and advice.

 Jaap de Hoop Scheffer, former Dutch politician, former Secretary-General of NATO, and Professor Emeritus of International Relations and Diplomatic Practice
 Dan Saxon, former prosecutor at the United Nations International Criminal Tribunal for the Former Yugoslavia (ICTY) in The Hague

References

External links 
 Official website

Leiden University
Liberal arts colleges at universities in the Netherlands
Educational institutions established in 2010
Organisations based in The Hague
2010 establishments in the Netherlands